Uroš Dojčinović (Serbian Cyrillic: Урош Дојчиновић, born 1959 in Belgrade) is a Serbian classical guitarist.

He is professor of classical guitar at the Music school "Josip Slavenski" in Belgrade. He is also a composer and pedagogue.

Official Homepage
Homepage

Sources

External links
Biography at Mel Bay
History of the Guitar in Former Yugoslavia (by Prof. Uroš Dojčinović)
Music School "Josip Slavenski" (employee page)

Serbian classical guitarists
1959 births
Living people